Newton Ketton is a small village in County Durham, in England. It is situated to the north of Darlington.

External links
 

Villages in County Durham